The Diocese of Faras was a Christian bishopric in Nobadia during the Middle Ages and is today a titular see of the Coptic Orthodox Church. Its seat was originally at Faras (Pakhoras). Later, its bishops sat at Qasr Ibrim.

Despite Faras's submersion following the building of the Aswan High Dam, the see is still claimed by the Coptic church's Titular Bishop of the Great and Ancient Metropolis of Nubia, who is styled Bishop of Faras of Nobatia. The current ordinary is Bishop Sarapamon (Serapis Amon).

Bishops of Pakhoras
 Aetios, c. 620
 Sarapion
 Vacant during invasion of Nobadia and Makouria by the Caliphate
 Pilatos, late 7th century
 Paulos, a Miaphysite, died 709 or 719
 Mena, a Miaphysite, died 730
 Matthaios (Old Nubian: Maththaios), died 31 May 766
 Ignatios, died 23 January 802
 Ioannes I, died 809 (?)
 Ioannes II
 Markos, c. 820
 Khael I, died 827 (?)
 Thomas, a Miaphysite, 827-862, died 16 July 862
 Iesu I (Old Nubian: Iesou), died 866

Metropolitans of Pakhoras
 Kyros, a Miaphysite, died 902
 Andreas, died 903 (not a metropolitan bishop?)
 Kollutwos, a Miaphysite, died 13 August 923
 Stephanos, a Miaphysite, died 14 July 926
 Elias, a Miaphysite, died 6 August 952
 Aaron (Old Nubian: Aron), a Miaphysite, died 12 December 972
 Petros I, a Miaphysite, died 20 July 999

Bishops of Pakhoras
 Ioannes III, died 21 September 1005
 Marianos, former archimandrite of Puke, died 11 November 1036
 Merkurios (Old Nubian: Merkourios), died 1 July 1056
 Unknown
 Petros II, a Miaphysite, died 22 May 1062
 Georgios, a Miaphysite, died 14 August 1097
 Khael II, died 5 May 1130
 Iesu II (Old Nubian: Iesou), died 4 June 1175
 Unknown
 Tamer, died 31 March 1193 (?)
 Unknown
 Timotheos, a Monophysite, "Bishop of Phrim and Pakhoras," resident at Primnis, consecrated in 1372

See also
 Holy Synod of the Coptic Church

Sources
 Jakobielski, S. A Chronology of the Bishops of Faras.
 Michalowski, K. FARAS.

Oriental Orthodoxy in Sudan
Titular sees of the Coptic Orthodox Church of Alexandria